Catamount Pond may refer to the following

 Catamount Pond (New Hampshire)
 Catamount Pond (Franklin County, New York)
 Catamount Pond (St. Lawrence County, New York)